Nanine is a 1749 play by the French writer Voltaire.

1749 plays
Plays by Voltaire